Gorham is a village in Jackson County, Illinois, United States. The population was 236 at the 2010 census. It is known locally for its near-annihilation during the deadly Tri-State Tornado of 1925.

Geography
Gorham is located at  (37.716897, -89.485804).

Gorham is located in the middle of the Mississippi River floodplain, which is among the most fertile farming regions in the Midwestern United States. The village is at a particularly low elevated region of the floodplain known as the "Bottoms". This makes it more susceptible to flooding, as it was threatened in the infamous Great Flood of 1993 and the New Year's Day Flood of 2016.

Less than one mile south of Gorham is a large hill named Fountain Bluff. Though the bluff is not exceptionally well-known, its rock faces do attract occasional rock-climbers.  Etched into cliffs on the north side of this landform are several Native American petroglyphs.

Demographics

As of the census of 2000, there were 256 people, 101 households, and 69 families residing in the village. The racial makeup of the village was 98.44% White and 1.56% Native American.

There were 101 households, out of which 38.6% had children under the age of 18 living with them, 55.4% were married couples living together, 9.9% had a female householder with no husband present, and 30.7% were non-families. 28.7% of all households were made up of individuals, and 17.8% had someone living alone who was 65 years of age or older.  The average household size was 2.53 and the average family size was 3.16.

In the village, the population was spread out, with 31.3% under the age of 18, 6.3% from 18 to 24, 29.3% from 25 to 44, 19.5% from 45 to 64, and 13.7% who were 65 years of age or older.  The median age was 33 years. For every 100 females, there were 88.2 males.  For every 100 females age 18 and over, there were 81.4 males.

The median income for a household in the village was $22,750, and the median income for a family was $30,000. Males had a median income of $33,333 versus $15,625 for females. The per capita income for the village was $11,739.  About 19.1% of families and 26.8% of the population were below the poverty line, including 38.0% of those under the age of eighteen and 15.0% of those 65 or over.

Notable person

 Joe Grace, outfielder for the St Louis Browns and Washington Senators

References

Villages in Jackson County, Illinois
Villages in Illinois